Gainford is a hamlet in Alberta, Canada within Parkland County.

The hamlet is located in Census Division No. 11 and in the federal riding of Yellowhead.  The north border of Gainford shares part of the shore of Isle Lake.  The Yellowhead Highway (Alberta Highway 16) passes through Gainford.

History 
The first post office opened in 1910.  The community takes its name from Gainford, County Durham, England.

Demographics 

See also 
List of communities in Alberta
List of designated places in Alberta
List of hamlets in Alberta

References 

Hamlets in Alberta
Designated places in Alberta
Parkland County